Djermaya Solar Power Station (DSPS) is a planned  solar power plant in Chad. The solar farm is under development and is owned by a consortium comprising (a) Aldwych International Limited, a subsidiary of Anergi Group (working on behalf of InfraCo Africa) and (b) Smart Energies. The power station will be developed in phases. Phase 1, with capacity of 32 megawatts will be developed first. Phase 2, with capacity of 28 megawatts will be developed after Phase 1.

Location
The project site is uninhabited, prior to installation of the power station.

Overview
There are three main objectives in the development of this solar farm. The first objective is to increase the grid supply of electricity in Chad. Secondly, Chad depends primarily on electricity derived from expensive fossil fuel-fired installations. DSPS diversifies generation to include green renewable energy. Thirdly, the project involves the improvement of the transmission network, by strengthening the transmission between N'Djamena and D'jermaya.

The development involves construction of a 32 megawatts solar farm. It also includes the construction of a new  33kV transmission line from the power station to the electricity substation at Lamadji, in northern N'Djamena. Two new transformers, each rated at 33/90kV, will be installed at the substation at Lamadji. Later, the solar farm will be expanded to capacity of 60 megawatts, by the addition of 28 megawatts in new capacity.

Ownership
This power station is owned by a consortium whose members are illustrated in the table below. The members of the consortium are expected to form a special purpose vehicle company, which for descriptive purposes, we will call D'jermaya Solar Company, which will operate and manage the power station.

Construction and timeline
In July 2020, armed with a 25-year power purchase agreement, the owners of D'jermaya Solar Company advertised for qualified contractors to bid for the engineering, procurement and construction (EPC) contract, for the first phase (32 MW).

Funding
The project has received partial funding from the African Development Bank and from the European Union–Africa Infrastructure Fund. Total cost has been budgeted at €60.3 million (approx. US$70.9 million).

See also

 List of power stations in Chad
 N'Djamena Amea Solar Power Station

References

External links
 Approximate Location of D'jermaya Solar Power Station

N'Djamena
Solar power stations in Chad
Proposed energy infrastructure